Joann Baker (born 24 November 1960) is a Canadian swimmer. She competed in three events at the 1976 Summer Olympics.

References

External links
 

1960 births
Living people
Canadian female swimmers
Olympic swimmers of Canada
Swimmers at the 1976 Summer Olympics
Sportspeople from Moose Jaw
Swimmers at the 1979 Pan American Games
Pan American Games silver medalists for Canada
Pan American Games medalists in swimming
Medalists at the 1975 Pan American Games
20th-century Canadian women
21st-century Canadian women